The women's 4 x 100 metre medley competition of the swimming events at the 2011 World Aquatics Championships was held on July 30 with the heats and the final.

The American team consisting of Natalie Coughlin, Rebecca Soni, Dana Vollmer, and Missy Franklin won the gold in an Americas record time of 3:52.36.

Records
Prior to the competition, the existing world and championship records were as follows.

Results

Heats
17 teams participated in 3 heats.

Final
The final was held at 19:45.

References

External links
2011 World Aquatics Championships: Women's 4 x 100 metre medley relay start list, from OmegaTiming.com; retrieved 2011-07-23.
FINA World Championships, Swimming: United States Smokes Women's 400 Medley Relay; Rattles World Record; Sets American Record, Textile Best, Swimming World Magazine (2011-07-30); retrieved 2011-08-09.

Medley relay 4x100 metre, women's
World Aquatics Championships
2011 in women's swimming